Kohler Range ) is a mountain range in the Marie Byrd Land of Antarctica. The range is about 64 km (40 mi) long and stands between the base of Martin Peninsula and Smith Glacier. The range is composed of two ice-covered plateaus which are oriented East-West and are separated by the Kohler Glacier, a distributary which flows north from Smith Glacier.

The range was discovered on February 24, 1940 by Rear Admiral Richard Evelyn Byrd and other members of the USAS in an airplane flight from a ship named Bear. Byrd named the range after American manufacturer, and Governor of Wisconsin Walter J. Kohler, Jr., who helped finance the expedition and seaplane from which the discovery was made.

References
Kohler Range, Antarctic Gazetteer, Australian Antarctic Data Centre. Retrieved November 6, 2006.

Mountain ranges of Marie Byrd Land